Jurassic World Camp Cretaceous is an American animated science fiction action-adventure television series developed by Zack Stentz. A part of the Jurassic Park franchise, it features the voices of Paul-Mikél Williams, Sean Giambrone, Kausar Mohammed, Jenna Ortega, Ryan Potter, and Raini Rodriguez as a group of teenage campers who become stranded on Isla Nublar after multiple dinosaurs escape their habitats. Jameela Jamil, Glen Powell, Stephanie Beatriz, Bradley Whitford, Angus Sampson, Greg Chun, Benjamin Flores Jr., Kirby Howell-Baptiste, Haley Joel Osment, and Andrew Kishino also star in recurring roles.

The series debuted on Netflix on September 18, 2020. It received generally positive reviews for its animation, characters, and voice cast, though responses to its character designs and writing were mixed. In 2021, a second season was released on January 22; a third on May 21; and a fourth season on December 3. A fifth and final season was released on July 21, 2022. A standalone interactive special titled Hidden Adventure was released on November 15, 2022. Aaron Hammersley and Scott Kreamer are the showrunners of the series; they executive produce along Lane Lueras, Steven Spielberg, Colin Trevorrow, and Frank Marshall. At the 48th Annie Awards, the series won for Outstanding Achievement for Animated Effects.

Premise
After winning a video game, dinosaur fanatic Darius Bowman is given the opportunity to visit Camp Cretaceous, an exclusive adventure dinosaur camp on Isla Nublar. Once there, Darius meets five other teenagers—Ben, Yaz, Brooklynn, Kenji, and Sammy—who were also chosen for the once-in-a-lifetime experience. However, when the dinosaurs break free from their habitats, the campers are stranded and forced to venture across the island without any help in the hopes of finding a way out and getting out alive.

Voice cast

Main

 Paul-Mikél Williams as Darius Bowman, a camper who is a dinosaur fanatic from Oakland and leader of the group.
 Sean Giambrone as Ben Pincus, a sensitive and shy camper who takes care of an Ankylosaurus he names Bumpy.
 Kausar Mohammed as Yasmina "Yaz" Fadoula, the "most athletically assured" of the camp goers, who later begins a relationship with Sammy.
 Jenna Ortega as Brooklynn, a famous travel vlogger and camper at Camp Cretaceous.
 Ryan Potter as Kenji Kon, a self-appointed VIP camper described as the "self-proclaimed alpha male of the group".
 Raini Rodriguez as Sammy Gutierrez, a camper filled with enthusiasm for the experience of being at Camp Cretaceous, who later begins a relationship with Yaz.

Recurring
 Jameela Jamil as Roxie (seasons 1, 5; guest season 2), a paleontologist and camp counselor at Camp Cretaceous.
 Glen Powell as Dave (seasons 1, 5; guest season 2), a paleontologist and camp counselor at Camp Cretaceous.
 Greg Chun as Dr. Henry Wu (season 3; guest season 1), InGen's chief genetic engineer who re-created the dinosaurs.
 Benjamin Flores Jr. as Brandon Bowman (season 5; guest seasons 1, 4), Darius' older brother.
 Secunda Wood as Island Announcers / Computers, the voice given to various computer systems on both Isla Nubla and Mantah Corp Island.
 Stephanie Beatriz as Tiff (season 2; archival footage season 3), Mitch's wife and a big-game hunter.
 Angus Sampson as Hap (season 2), a mysterious and brooding tour guide who works for Tiff and Mitch.
 Bradley Whitford as Mitch (season 2), Tiff's husband and a big-game hunter.
 Dave B. Mitchell as Hawkes (season 5; guest season 3), the lead mercenary hired to protect Dr. Wu. He is later hired by Mantah Corp.
 Mitchell also voices Reed (guest, season 3), a mercenary hired to protect Dr. Wu.
 Kirby Howell-Baptiste as Dr. Mae Turner (seasons 4–5), a behavioural paleoneurobiologist contracted by Mantah Corp.
 Haley Joel Osment as Kash D. Langford (seasons 4–5), a roboticist and senior employee of Mantah Corp.
 Roger Craig Smith as B.R.A.D. (seasons 4–5), the mass-produced Bio-Robotic Assistance Droids used by Manta Corp. Smith also voices the upgraded model, B.R.A.D.-X.
 Andrew Kishino as Daniel Kon (season 5; guest season 4), Kenji's father and the President of Mantah Corp.
 Avrielle Corti as Lana Molina (season 5), an investor in Mantah Corp who works for BioSyn.

Guest
 Jeff Bergman as Mr. DNA (season 1 and Hidden Adventure), the animated mascot of Jurassic World.
Bergman also voices Paddock Worker One (Hidden Adventure), an unnamed worker in the Raptor paddock.
 James Arnold Taylor as Eddie (season 1; archival footage season 3), an assistant who had his birthday interrupted by the escape of the dinosaurs.
 Keston John as Fredrick Bowman (seasons 1–2), Darius and Brandon's deceased father.
 John also voices Dawson (season 3), a mercenary hired to protect Dr. Wu.
 Cherise Boothe as The Pilot (season 3), a mercenary pilot hired by Dr. Wu. 
 Okieriete Onaodowan as Mr. Gold (season 5), an investor in Mantah Corp. 
 Jon Rudnitsky as Cyrus (season 5), an investor in Mantah Corp. 
 Adam Harrington as Lewis Dodgson (season 5), the Head of Research at BioSyn.
 Mikey Kelley as The Twins (season 5), twin brothers who are mercenaries hired by Mantah Corp. 
 Antonio Alvarez as Godinez (season 5), a mercenary hired by Mantah Corp.
 Bill Nye as Hal Brimford (Hidden Adventure), a former employee of Jurassic World who left a message for Owen Grady that leads to the Hidden Adventure, an amusement park that never opened.
 Chris Jai Alex as Paddock Worker Two (Hidden Adventure), an unnamed worker in the Raptor paddock.
A mercenary named Hansen also appears in the third season but does not have a credited voice actor.

Several notable creatures from the movie franchise make an appearance. This includes the Tyrannosaurus rex Rexy, the quartet of Velociraptors Blue, Charlie, Delta and Echo, the Indominus rex, the Mosasaurus and the Spinosaurus from Jurassic Park III.
Other notable dinosaurs that appear include Bumpy, an Ankylosaurus with an asymmetrical face who befriends Ben Pincus; Toro, a Carnotaurus that hunts the campers; Grim, Chaos and Limbo, a trio of Baryonyx; the Scorpios rex, the first hybrid dinosaur created by Dr. Henry Wu; Big Eatie and Little Eatie, a mother and daughter pair of Tyrannosaurus rex; Pierce, a Kentrosaurus cared for by Mae Turner; Angel and Rebel, a pair of young Sino-Spino hybrids and Firecracker, a baby Brachiosaurus.

Episodes

Season 1 (2020)

Season 2 (2021)

Season 3 (2021)

Season 4 (2021)

Season 5 (2022)

Special (2022)

Production

According to series developer and consulting producer Zack Stentz, who also pitched the idea for the series to Universal Pictures, production on Jurassic World Camp Cretaceous began as early as April 2017. In June 2018, Scott Kreamer took over a premise and pilot script written by Stentz and worked on the show's early design. In 2019, a CGI-animated series was announced to debut on Netflix the following year, to be set during the events of the 2015 film Jurassic World. A joint project between Netflix, Universal Pictures, Amblin Entertainment, and DreamWorks Animation, Scott Kreamer and Aaron Hammersley worked together as the series' showrunners, executive-producing the series along with Lane Lueras, Steven Spielberg, Colin Trevorrow, and Frank Marshall.

Spielberg did not want the series to be a "kiddy version" of the Jurassic Park films, insisting that the young characters be placed in dangerous scenarios, as in the films. Kreamer and Hammersley joined the project after it was greenlit and they shared Spielberg's vision. The three were inspired by various Spielberg films which often depicted children facing danger. Unlike the Jurassic Park films, where children are secondary characters rescued by adults, the series focuses instead on the teenagers and their efforts to survive on their own. While working, crew members watched the film Jurassic World several times to develop tie-ins between the film and the show, even creating a map of Isla Nublar to help with the process.

According to staff writer Sheela Shrinivas and story editor Josie Campbell, the hardest characters to develop for the show were Yaz and Brooklynn. The writers struggled to find ways to make the characters "likable" to viewers. However, they ultimately decided that the best thing to do would be to bring out the character's weaknesses to have viewers sympathize with each character. The role of Dave was written specifically for Glen Powell, which he said made voicing the character "easy and fun".

While executive producing, Trevorrow said he had two rules he told the show's crew: to treat the dinosaurs as actual animals when creating a story, and to avoid animating aerial shots to keep scenes "grounded". Programs such as V-Ray, Autodesk Maya, and Nuke were used to create the series. The COVID-19 pandemic began during production, and the series crew had to work from home.

The series also features original music composed by Leo Birenberg, using themes from the Jurassic Park and Jurassic World soundtracks, composed by John Williams and Michael Giacchino respectively. In an interview, Birenberg said that he first heard of the show from music executives Alex Nixon and Frank Garcia, who he had previously worked with on Kung Fu Panda: The Paws of Destiny, after being recommended by Giacchino, who he had already met.

The second season was released on January 22, 2021. Early drafts for the season considered having the character of Ben die shortly after his fall in the first season's finale, but these plans were abandoned and Ben survived to continue appearing in the series. Colin Trevorrow attended a virtual panel at the 2020 New York Comic Con held in October, in which he said that the show's second season gave the production crew "a lot of freedom", as the first season depended entirely on the context found in Jurassic World, and the second season was set six months before the opening sequence in Fallen Kingdom.

In an interview, Trevorrow told Comic Book Resources that the appearance of animal trafficking in Fallen Kingdom encouraged the writers of Camp Cretaceous to feature big-game hunting as a major plot point of the show's second season to teach children that these problems still existed. When asked about the series' future, Trevorrow told Screen Rant that the crew at Camp Cretaceous had a story already planned out that would "take these kids deeper into a journey that pulls further and further away from Jurassic World". A ten-episode third season was released on May 21, 2021.

On developing the third season, Kreamer said that they "wanted the kids to have their own agency and put their fate in their own hands [...] we wanted to take some time and do some cool stuff, and have some fun, and do things that we hadn't done before because there was no time to do it because the kids were always running for their lives". When asked about transferring the animated series into the live-action Jurassic World universe, he responded by saying: "I would never say never. As far as I know, there are no immediate plans for that to happen but it would be pretty cool if it did". Along with Kreamer and Raini Rodriguez, Trevorrow teased a fourth season: "We do have a beginning, middle, and an end for it. We do [have a plan], and there is an ending in sight. Scott and the writers have plotted out a pretty exciting way forward". Trevorrow explained that the show would not include the volcano eruption scene from Fallen Kingdom and said that "if we are able to tell the whole story that we have plotted out here, that the writers have built, it will really give us a chance to go into some really new spaces that are a real departure from the movies".

A fourth season was released on December 3, 2021. In an interview, Kreamer confirmed the return of the Spinosaurus, a dinosaur first depicted in Jurassic Park III (2001), and said the fourth season would take place on an island "previously unseen in the Jurassic canon". The writers originally thought the B.R.A.Ds were too unrealistic for the series. After watching a video by Boston Dynamics about robots, however, the writers decided to include them. On developing the relationship between Kenji and Brooklynn, Kreamer said the idea was first brought up and dismissed during the making of season two. He added: "It's a kid show and it's not necessarily something you would do in Jurassic. But it felt [like] a natural progression. If you've got six kids on an island for six months, feelings are going to develop. And we wanted to approach it in a way that felt organic to the show and made sense with our characters".

A fifth and final season was released on July 21, 2022.

A standalone interactive special titled Hidden Adventure was released on November 15, 2022.

Home media 
The first three seasons were released on DVD on May 3, 2022, by Universal Pictures Home Entertainment.

Reception

Season 1
On review aggregator Rotten Tomatoes, the first season of Jurassic World Camp Cretaceous holds an approval rating of 77% based on 13 reviews, with an average rating of 6.6/10. The website's critical consensus reads, "With a spirited group of campers and exciting new adventures, Camp Cretaceous successfully evolves the Jurassic World franchise for younger viewers - though it may be a bit too violent for some."

Writing for Bloody Disgusting, Meagan Navarro called the season "the perfect Amblin mix of funny, touching, and daring", praising the voice cast and the dinosaur designs, but calling the character designs generic. Jesse Hassenger from The A.V. Club gave the season a grade rating of a C+, calling the show unrealistic storywise, but also saying that its character development was "clever" and that the show depicted teenagers accurately. Collider's Haleigh Foutch gave the season an A−, while Alana Joli Abbott of Den of Geek gave it four stars out of five. Overall, both critics lauded the animation, cast, and central story of the season. From the Los Angeles Times, Robert Lloyd compared the animation style to that found in the original characters in Scooby-Doo, and complimented the voice acting, stating that it "keeps them real enough". Nick Allen of RogerEbert.com considered the series' entertainment value to be worthy of comparison to the franchise's original trilogy, stating that "because of the care put into making [the series], it's more special than just a spin-off."

In a negative review, Empire journalist Ben Travis gave the season a rating of two stars out of five, criticizing the show's writing and its characters, who he said were "unlikeable" and "drawn in thin stereotypes and forced dialogue", concluding that the first season was only meant for younger viewers. On the other side of the spectrum, Beth Elderkin of io9 found the season to be excessively violent, pointing out that "not an episode goes by without at least one kid being put in mortal danger". However, she noted the consistency throughout the season, stating that "it's rare to find a modern children's show that trusts its audience to handle more intense subject material [...] even if it's unsettling at times". Having watched the first episode, the crew at Decider hesitantly recommended viewers to stream the series.

Season 2
On Rotten Tomatoes, the second season holds an approval rating of 100% based on 5 reviews, with an average rating of 6.8/10. Den of Geek critic Alana Joli Abbott gave the second season of Camp Cretaceous a four and a half out of five star rating, stating that it improved compared to its first, while Daniel Hart from Ready Steady Cut said it did not, giving the season three stars out of five, and calling it a "missed opportunity". Danielle Solzman, from Solzy at the Movies, praised the exploration of the fictional Isla Nublar and the pacing of all eight episodes. Writing for Mashable, Brooke Bajgrowicz complimented the overall story in the season and the growing tension, but criticized the plot of the episode "Brave", which took place entirely in a flashback and only focused on the character of Ben.

From Collider, Haleigh Foutch ranked the season in her list of the top seven "new shows" to watch on Netflix, stating that the new season "leaves plenty of opportunity for action while making room for more character-focused moments". Screen Rant journalist John Orquiola lauded the show's story, action, and characters, specifically in the episode titled "The Watering Hole", stating that it was similar to the ending of the original Jurassic Park, and a "clever spin" on the directing style of Steven Spielberg. Rafael Motamayor, writing for The New York Observer, also shared positive feedback to "The Watering Hole", stating that the episode was "full of wonder" that allowed the show to "capture the feeling of the original Jurassic Park, while bringing the dinosaurs to the forefront of the story."

Season 3
The third season of Camp Cretaceous received highly positive reviews from critics, with some calling it the series' best. On Rotten Tomatoes, the third season holds an approval rating of 100% based on 7 reviews, with an average rating of 8.3/10. From ComingSoon.net, Jeff Ames gave it a "9/10" for its character development and wrote that while it continued to use the same formula for its action sequences, "the creators know these characters so well, and have such a firm grip on audience expectations, that they manage to outmaneuver their episodic trappings and deliver a final product that satisfies, thrills, and, best of all, leaves you wanting more." Animation World Network's Victoria Davis also praised the season for its overall tone, noting that "the attention paid to small visuals adds to the heightened emotion by conveying a sense of aging and maturity in the characters." Furthermore, Den of Geek's Alana Joli Abbott gave it four stars and a half out of five for being able to balance "calmer, lighter moments with heart-pounding action, and real concern that favorite characters won't make it out alive", and said that the series was one that children of all ages could enjoy. However, Comic Book Resources's Renaldo Matadeen gave a negative review, finding that the finale "botched" Ben's character development when being separated from Bumpy, writing that "it's underwhelming and destroys the heroic nature he's developed. Ben should have made his own call in a rational and not melodramatic manner, so the next season could move past his screaming and anxious self. By trying to force humor, it just feels regressive and culls the badass leader he was turning into."

Season 4
IGN Amelia Emberwing gave positive notes to Yaz's character development for demonstrating that "even the toughest among us have moments where they need help". However, Emberwing found that for a series aimed at younger audiences, the violence against the dinosaurs was unnecessary; she said a scene in one episode served no purpose to the narrative and was "so pointlessly mean spirited that it warranted pausing and walking away for a moment". In her verdict, the reviewer said the cruelty shown on screen would taint the show's legacy and that the fourth season was a "frustrating hiccup in the story." Meanwhile, Jeff Ames from ComingSoon.net gave the fourth season an 8/10 and said, "it doesn't quite offer the narrative thrust (or intrigue) of previous seasons, but there's plenty to enjoy, even if you're only here to check out the beautifully rendered monsters." Brandon Zachary of Comic Book Resources gave extreme praise. He found the animation and designs to be "impressive" and wrote, "the overall strength of the writing and an ever-impressive voice cast help elevate it even further, making it one of the more genuinely exciting all-ages series on Netflix."

In its opening week, the fourth season of Camp Cretaceous was the seventh most-watched series on Netflix after accumulating a total of 16.9 million hours of watch time. In its second week, the season was watched for a total of 17.42 million hours, placing fourth in Netflix's top ten list for television shows in the English language.

Season 5
Upon release of the season, several parents on Common Sense Media gave openly critical or negative reviews. They expressed disappointment over the incorporation of a romantic relationship between Yaz and Sammy and they felt that the show regressed too much into a mere teen-drama. Even reviews that were otherwise positive expressed critical reactions towards the shift in tone and focus.

Accolades

Notes

References

Citations

Videos

External links
 Official website
 
 
 
 

2020 American television series debuts
2022 American television series endings
2020s American animated television series
2020s American LGBT-related television series
2020s American science fiction television series
American action adventure television series
American animated action television series
American animated adventure television series
American animated science fiction television series
American computer-animated television series
Animated television series about dinosaurs
Animated television shows based on films
Annie Award winners
English-language Netflix original programming
Interquel television series
Teen animated television series
Television series about summer camps
Television series by Amblin Entertainment
Television series by DreamWorks Animation
Television series set in 2015
Television series set in 2016
Television series set on fictional islands
Television shows set in Costa Rica
Works based on Jurassic Park